Rhipidarctia conradti is a moth in the family Erebidae. It was described by Oberthür in 1911. It is found in Cameroon, the Democratic Republic of Congo, Ivory Coast and Nigeria.

References

Natural History Museum Lepidoptera generic names catalog

Moths described in 1911
Syntomini